Gunpoint is the direction that a gun is pointing. It may also refer to:
"At gunpoint", under threat from a gun; see Coercion#Physical
Gunpoint (film), 1966 Western directed by Earl Bellamy starring Audie Murphy
 Gunpoint (video game), 2013 video game

See also
At Gunpoint, a 1955 American Western film